Ralph Soupault (1904–1962) was a French caricaturist.

1904 births
1962 deaths
French editorial cartoonists
French caricaturists